Glidden is a town in Carroll County, Iowa, United States. The population was 1,151 at the time of the 2020 census.

History
Glidden was laid out as a town in 1866. It was named either for Capt. W. T. Glidden, a railroad promoter, or in honor of Joseph Farwell Glidden, the inventor of barbed wire.

Geography
Glidden is located at  (42.058263, -94.728359).

Demographics

2010 census
As of the census of 2010, there were 1,146 people, 502 households, and 327 families living in the city. The racial makeup of the city was 99.0% White, 0.6% Native American, 0.1% Asian, and 0.3% from two or more races. Hispanic or Latino of any race were 0.6% of the population.

There were 502 households, of which 29.3% had children under the age of 18 living with them, 54.4% were married couples living together, 8.0% had a female householder with no husband present, 2.8% had a male householder with no wife present, and 34.9% were non-families. 30.5% of all households were made up of individuals, and 15.7% had someone living alone who was 65 years of age or older. The average household size was 2.26 and the average family size was 2.82.

The median age in the city was 44.8 years. 23.3% of residents were under the age of 18; 6.2% were between the ages of 18 and 24; 20.8% were from 25 to 44; 33.1% were from 45 to 64; and 16.5% were 65 years of age or older. The gender makeup of the city was 48.8% male and 51.2% female.

2000 census
As of the census of 2000, there were 1,253 people, 481 households, and 303 families living in the city. The racial makeup of the city was 99.20% White, 0.08% African American, 0.24% Native American, 0.16% Asian, and 0.32% from two or more races. Hispanic or Latino of any race were 0.24% of the population.

There were 481 households, out of which 30.8% had children under the age of 18 living with them, 53.4% were married couples living together, 6.9% had a female householder with no husband present, and 36.8% were non-families. 32.6% of all households were made up of individuals, and 17.7% had someone living alone who was 65 years of age or older. The average household size was 2.34 and the average family size was 3.00.

23.6% are under the age of 18, 8.0% from 18 to 24, 27.6% from 25 to 44, 24.5% from 45 to 64, and 16.3% who were 65 years of age or older. The median age was 40 years. For every 100 females, there were 87.0 males. For every 100 females age 18 and over, there were 87.6 males.

The median income for a household in the city was $35,333, and the median income for a family was $48,026. Males had a median income of $30,152 versus $21,914 for females. The per capita income for the city was $17,437. 5.7% of the population and 3.7% of families are living below the poverty line. Out of the total population, 4.9% of those under the age of 18 and 1.9% of those 65 and older are below the poverty line.

Education
The Glidden–Ralston Community School District consists of a combined elementary, middle and high school housed in one building. The school serves students from Glidden and the neighboring city of Ralston.

Notable people  

 Al Epperly (1918-2003), pitcher for Chicago Cubs
Merle Hay (1896–1917), one of the first three American servicemen to die in World War I
Ralph G. Neppel (1923–1987), recipient of the Medal of Honor

References

External links 
 

 Portal style website for Glidden City government, Business, City Development and more
 Presbyterian Church of Glidden–History
 City Data Comprehensive Statistical Data and more about Glidden.

Cities in Carroll County, Iowa
Cities in Iowa
1866 establishments in Iowa